Andy Ludwig (born May 14, 1964) is an American football coach. He currently is the offensive coordinator and quarterback coach at the University of Utah. He played college football at Snow College and Portland State University, graduating in 1988.

Coaching career
From 1987 to 1988, Ludwig was the receivers coach at Portland State. From 1989–1991, Ludwig was the quarterback and receiver coach at Idaho State. In 1992, Ludwig came to Utah to be the graduate assistant for the defense. From 1993 to 1994 Ludwig was the as the offensive coordinator at Augustana College in Sioux Falls, South Dakota. 1995 to 1996, he was the quarterback coach at Boise State University. In 1997 Ludwig was at California Polytechnic State University as offensive coordinator and quarterback coach. From 1998 to 2001, Ludwig was at California State University, Fresno, where he was a finalist for the Broyles Award in 2001. From 2002 to 2004, Ludwig was the offensive coordinator at Oregon.  After some difficult years, Ludwig was hired by close personal friend and newly named Utah head coach Kyle Whittingham for the 2005 season. Following the 2009 Sugar Bowl, Ludwig accepted the offensive coordinator position at Kansas State, but two months later he was hired to be the offensive coordinator for the California Golden Bears for the 2009 season. In 2011, Ludwig was hired by new San Diego State coach Rocky Long to be offensive coordinator for the Aztecs. Ludwig was hired to be the offensive coordinator for the Wisconsin Badgers for the 2013 season. After spending two seasons as the offensive coordinator at Wisconsin, he began the 2015 season under Derek Mason at Vanderbilt University as the offensive coordinator. On January 10, 2019, Ludwig was hired by the University of Utah to return as offensive coordinator.

Personal life
Ludwig and his wife, Jill, have a son (age 22) and a daughter (age 20).

References

External links
 Utah profile

1964 births
Living people
American football wide receivers
Augustana (South Dakota) Vikings football coaches
Boise State Broncos football coaches
California Golden Bears football coaches
Cal Poly Mustangs football coaches
Fresno State Bulldogs football coaches
Idaho State Bengals football coaches
Oregon Ducks football coaches
Portland State Vikings football coaches
Portland State Vikings football players
San Diego State Aztecs football coaches
Snow Badgers football players
Utah Utes football coaches
Vanderbilt Commodores football coaches
Wisconsin Badgers football coaches
Sportspeople from Ogden, Utah
Coaches of American football from Utah
Players of American football from Utah